1TV may refer to:

 1TV (Afghan TV channel)
 1TV (Macedonian TV channel)
 1TV (Armenia), or Public Television Company of Armenia (www.1tv.am)
 Channel One Russia (www.1tv.ru)
 First Channel (Georgian TV channel) (www.1tv.ge)

See also
 Channel 1 (disambiguation)
 TV1 (disambiguation)